Abhimanyu Cricket Academy is a multi-purpose stadium in Dehradun, Uttarakhand. The ground is mainly used for organizing matches of football, cricket and other sports. 

The academy is named after Uttarakhand cricketer Abhimanyu Easwaran's father RP Easwaran inspired by the character Abhimanyu in the Hindu epic Mahabharata. He incidentally used the same name for his son. RP Easwaran bought a piece of land in Dehradun in 2005 and started to build the stadium.

The stadium was established in 2007 when they hosted a match of Women's Domestic match between Uttar Pradesh Women and Railways Women. The ground has floodlights so that the stadium can host day-night matches. It is made considering all norms of BCCI so that Ranji Trophy matches can be played.

The venue was also host of 2015/16 Red Bull Campus Cricket World Finals where teams from India, South Africa, Australia, England, Sri Lanka, Pakistan, Bangladesh and United Arab Emirates were involved in a Twenty20 competition.

References

External links 

 Cricinfo
 Cricketarchive
 Red Bull Campus Cricket
 National School of Cricket official
 Google Maps

Sports venues in Uttarakhand
Buildings and structures in Dehradun
Sport in Dehradun
Cricket grounds in Uttarakhand
Sports venues completed in 2008
2008 establishments in Uttarakhand